Scots Presbyterian Church may refer to multiple churches:

 Scots Church, Cobh
 Scots Presbyterian Church, Albany
 Scots Presbyterian Church, Dublin
 Scots Presbyterian Church, Fremantle
 Scots Presbyterian Church, Kiama
 Scots Presbyterian Church, Melbourne